The Braiakaulung are an Indigenous Australian people, one of the five tribes of the Gunai/Kurnai nation, in the state of Victoria, Australia. They were recognized by Norman Tindale as an independent tribal grouping.

Name
The Braiakaulung are also known as the Brayakaboong, meaning "men of the west".

Language

Country
They extended west of Lake Wellington as far as Mount Baw Baw and Mount Howitt.

Alternative names
 Braiakolung
 Brayakaboong
 Brayakau
 Brayakaulung
 Breagalong
 Nulit (name applied to language spoken by several associated tribes)

Notes

Citations

Sources

Aboriginal peoples of Victoria (Australia)
History of Victoria (Australia)